Çubuqlu is a village and municipality in the Qusar Rayon of Azerbaijan. It has a population of 459.

References

Populated places in Qusar District